Oleg Nikolayevich Ozerov (Russian: Озеров Олег Николаевич, 17 June 1922 – 30 January 2007) was a Soviet World War II Army soldier who was a member of the French Resistance during World War II. He has been widely decorated for his wartime efforts by both the French and Russian governments.

Ozerov was born in Spassk, Ryazan Oblast in June 1922. After finishing secondary school in June 1940, he was called up to serve in the Red Army, in the border guards, and was sent to the Soviet Union’s western border where he completed an intensive artillery institute training course. He was stationed near Peremysl when war broke out on June 22, 1941. At the end of July he suffered shell shock and was taken prisoner. He then went through a number of Nazi concentration camps and work camps, the last of which was located in France near Bordeaux. With the help of French communists, Oleg Ozerov escaped and fought with a partisan detachment in Brittany (the Dombrovsky 13th International Brigade). He returned to his homeland at the end of 1945.

After leaving the army, he graduated from the Minsk Polytechnic Institute, worked at a construction firm, Minmontazhspetsstroi, and was involved in building factories and bringing gas to Moscow Oblast. He was manager of a trust, deputy minister, and director of the State Technical Scientific Research Institute.

In 1985, he became a deputy rector of the Moscow Transport Institute, where he also taught and later became the head of the Labour Protection Department.

Ozerov was also leader of Combatants Volontaires, an interregional association of veterans of the French Resistance. He was decorated with the National Order of Merit (France), the Croix de Guerre with swords, the Croix de Guerre, the Cross of the Volunteer Combatant and the Resistance Medal.

In 2004, he was present at the 60th anniversary of the Allied invasion of Normandy, France, which was also attended by Vladimir Putin. He died in January 2007.

References

Sources 

1922 births
2007 deaths
Communist members of the French Resistance
Escapees from Nazi concentration camps
People from Spassky District, Ryazan Oblast
Recipients of the Ordre national du Mérite
Recipients of the Resistance Medal
Soviet border guards
Soviet escapees
Soviet military personnel of World War II
Soviet prisoners of war